is a Japan-exclusive Action/Strategy/Role Playing game for the WonderSwan. It is the first video game to be based on the One Piece manga and anime.

Plot
, the king of the pirates had obtained wealth, fame and power from people all over the world. Before his execution, he announced that he had left his treasure, the One Piece in a single place. Because of this, many pirates from all around the world set sail for the grand line. The time period was known as the "Great Pirate Era". Twenty years later a young man known as  finally sets out to sea. This game is based on the East Blue saga and the first One Piece film.

Gameplay

Main game
The player must use playing cards to move around the area in order to reach a certain destination. the card contains the type of pathway and the number of spaces the player can move. Along the way are surprise enemy attacks which are dealt with by using a pathway to reach the opponent standing there and give damage to him/her of the ship itself. The player wins the battle if all three enemies are defeated or the enemy ship is destroyed.

Playable characters

Bosses

References

External links
From TV Animation - One Piece: Become the Pirate King! at GameFAQs

2000 video games
WonderSwan games
Bandai games
Become The Pirate King!
Strategy video games
Japan-exclusive video games
Video games developed in Japan